Portland High School is a public high school established in 1821 in Portland, Maine (Cumberland County), United States, which educates grades 9–12.  The school is part of the Portland Public Schools district, and is one of three high schools in that district, along with Deering High School and Casco Bay High School. It is located at 284 Cumberland Avenue in downtown Portland. Along with its sister school, Deering High School, a family can choose which of the two to send their students to.

History

Established in 1821 originally as a boys' school, Portland High School is one of the oldest high schools in the United States.  Joseph Libbey was its first principal. A separate school for girls was added in 1850, and in 1863 the school moved to Cumberland Avenue, its present location. The original school building on that site, which is now the middle wing of the modern school, was originally divided into two by a brick wall running from top to bottom of the building to divide the girls from the boys.  Much of the wall has been removed, but its remains can still be seen in the basement.

The main school was constructed between 1915 and 1918, according to the plaque by the front entrance. On February 15, 1919 the new Portland High School along Cumberland Avenue, opened. It was designed by Miller & Mayo. The new school had a lecture hall and mechanical arts classrooms. It also had two kitchen classrooms, three sewing rooms and two classrooms for typing. The school was added to the National Register of Historic Places on November 23, 1984.

In 1989 a new annex was opened containing more classrooms, a cafeteria, a theater/auditorium (named for John Ford) and an athletic facility.

Approximately 700-1000 students are enrolled each year. In June 2010, 174 students graduated from Portland High School.

Sports
Portland High School uses the off-campus Fitzpatrick Stadium, Hadlock Field, Portland Expo, and William B. Troubh(Portland Ice Arena) for the school's sporting events.

The Deering High School and Portland High School football teams have played each other each Thanksgiving since 1911, except for 1920 and 2020.

Notable alumni
 Ted Lowry, heavyweight boxer
 Wyatt Allen, Olympic gold and bronze medalist in rowing
 James Phinney Baxter III
 Paul Franklin Clark (1882–1983), bacteriologist and virologist
 John Ford (then known as John Martin Feeney), film director
 Robert Hale, U.S. Congressman (1943-1959)
 Gail Laughlin, State senator, lawyer, and suffrage activist
 Dave Littlefield, Former Major League Baseball executive, Senior Vice President and General Manager of the Pittsburgh Pirates
 John Lynch, U.S. Representative
 Admiral Robert E. Peary, explorer, first to claim to reach the North Pole
 Quinton Porter, professional football player
 Thomas B. Reed, Speaker of the United States House of Representatives
 Lois Rice, corporate executive, scholar and education policy expert
 Reginald Bartholomew, U.S. Diplomat/Ambassador (1936-2012)
 John Calvin Stevens, architect, pioneer of Shingle Style

See also

National Register of Historic Places listings in Portland, Maine

Notes

External links
Portland High School homepage
Portland High School profile provided by schooltree.org
Portland High Lacrosse
Portland High Football

Educational institutions established in 1821
Public high schools in Maine
Schools in Portland, Maine
School buildings on the National Register of Historic Places in Maine
1821 establishments in Maine
National Register of Historic Places in Portland, Maine